Michael Levin (born 21 May 1943) is an American philosopher and writer. He is professor emeritus of philosophy at City University of New York. He has published on metaphysics, epistemology, race, homosexuality, animal rights, the philosophy of archaeology, the philosophy of logic, philosophy of language, and the philosophy of science.

Levin's central research interests are in epistemology (reliabilism and Gettier problems) and in philosophy of race.

Education
Levin graduated from Stuyvesant High School in 1960, earned his Bachelor of Arts degree from Michigan State University in 1964, and studied at Columbia University where he received a doctoral degree in 1969. His dissertation was titled "Wittgenstein's Philosophy of Mathematics".

Philosophical views
Levin advocates reliabilism in epistemology and the theory of compatibilism in free will.

Political and social views

Torture
In the 1982 article "The Case for Torture", Levin argued that "there are situations where torture is not merely permissible but morally mandatory." Levin reiterated this view in 2009.

Economics
For Christmas 2000, Levin published a libertarian critique of Dickens's popular novella A Christmas Carol in which he defends Scrooge as "an entrepreneur whose ideas and practices benefit his employees, society at large, and himself."

Homosexuality
Levin has questioned the morality, wisdom, and naturalness of homosexuality. He argues that homosexual acts are abnormal because their participants are not using their sexual organs for what they are for, and that this abnormality must be a source of unhappiness, even though it may go unrecognized. In his book Sexual Desire (1986), the philosopher Roger Scruton criticized Levin's attempt to show that homosexuality is abnormal, calling it absurd. Timothy Murphy has criticized Levin's arguments about homosexuality in detail. Murphy states in Gay Science (1997) that while Levin "more or less accepts that there is a strong biological basis for homoerotic orientation" he nevertheless believes that discrimination against gay people may be defensible on several grounds, including the possibility that there is a biologically based dislike of homosexuality.

Feminism

Feminist Susan Faludi writes in Backlash: The Undeclared War Against American Women (1991) that Levin's 1988 book Feminism and Freedom characterizes feminism as an "antidemocratic, if not totalitarian, ideology" without a single redeeming feature.

Race
Levin agrees with Arthur Jensen and Richard Lynn that white people score higher on IQ tests than black people due to genetic differences—a view that has been criticized by scholars such as Leon Kamin of Princeton University.

Levin defended this view in an exchange in the journal Philosophy of the Social Sciences.

Throughout the 1990s Levin frequently wrote about race differences in intelligence, biology, and morality for the white nationalist publication American Renaissance. The Southern Poverty Law Center classifies him as an "unabashed white supremacist."

Personal life
Like Michael H. Hart, he is one of the few ethnic Jewish supporters of white nationalism.

Levin is married to philosopher of mathematics Margarita Levin.

Selected publications

Books
 Metaphysics and the Mind-Body Problem, Oxford University Press, 1979. .
 Feminism and Freedom, Transaction Publishers, 1987. 
 Why Race Matters: Race Differences and What They Mean, Praeger Publishers, 1997.

Articles and essays
 Levin, M. E. 1968. Fine, Mathematics, and Theory Change. The Journal of Philosophy 65, no. 2: 52–56.
 Levin, M. E. 1971. Length Relativity. The Journal of Philosophy 68, no. 6: 164–174.
 Levin, M. E. 1973. On explanation in archaeology: a rebuttal to Fritz and Plog. American Antiquity 38, no. 4: 387–395.
 Levin, M. E. 1974. Kant's Derivation of the Formula of Universal Law as an Ontological Argument. Kant-Studien 65, no. 1-4: 50–66.
 Levin, M. E. 1975. Kripke's argument against the identity thesis. The Journal of Philosophy 72, no. 6: 149–167.
 Levin, M. E. 1975. Relativity, Spatial and Ontological. Nous: 243–267.
 Levin, M. E. 1976. The extensionality of causation and causal-explanatory contexts. Philosophy of Science 43, no. 2: 266–277.
 Levin, M. E. 1976. On the ascription of functions to objects, with special reference to inference in archaeology. Philosophy of the Social Sciences 6, no. 3: 227.
 Levin, M. E. 1977. Animal rights evaluated. The Humanist 37, no. 4: 12–15.
 Levin, M. E., and M. R. Levin. 1977. Flagpoles, shadows and deductive explanation. Philosophical Studies 32, no. 3: 293–299.
 Levin, M. E., and M. R. Levin. 1978. The independence results of set theory: An informal exposition. Synthese 38, no. 1: 1-34.
 Levin, M. E., and M. R. Levin. 1978. Lavoisier's Slow Burn. Philosophy of Science 45, no. 4: 626–629.
 Levin, M. E. 1979. On theory-change and meaning-change. Philosophy of Science 46, no. 3: 407–424.
 Levin, M. E. 1979. Quine's View (s) of Logical Truth. Essays on the Philosophy ofW. V. Quine: 45–67.
 Levin, M. E. 1979. The universalizability of moral judgments revisited. Mind 88, no. 1: 115.
 Levin, M. E. 1979. Forcing and the Indeterminacy of Translation. Erkenntnis 14, no. 1: 25–32.
 Levin, M. E. 1979. Ahab as Socratic Philosopher: The Myth of the Cave Inverted. ATQ: The American Transcendental Quarterly 41: 61–73.
 Levin, M. E., and M. R. Levin. 1979. The modal confusion in Rawls' original position. Analysis 39, no. 2: 82.
 Levin, M. E. 1980. Reverse discrimination, shackled runners, and personal identity. Philosophical Studies 37, no. 2: 139–149.
 Levin, M. E. 1981. Equality of opportunity. The Philosophical Quarterly 31, no. 123: 110–125.
 Levin, M. E. 1981. Is racial discrimination special? The Journal of Value Inquiry 15, no. 3: 225–234.
 Levin, M. E. 1981. Phenomenal Properties. Philosophy and Phenomenological Research 42, no. 1: 42–58.
 Levin, M. E. 1984. Why we believe in other minds. Philosophy and Phenomenological Research 44, no. 3: 343–359.
 Levin, M. E. 2007. Bundling Hume with Kripkenstein. Synthese 155, no. 1: 35–64.
 Levin, M. E. 2007. Compatibilism and Special Relativity. The Journal of philosophy 104, no. 9: 433–463.
 Levin, M. E. 1982 The Case for Torture
 Levin, M. E. nd.  In Defense of Scrooge , a libertarian apology in favor of the popular protagonist of Dickens' A Christmas Carol

See also
American philosophy
Biology and sexual orientation
List of American philosophers
Logical truth

References

External links
Levin's academic page at CUNY
Michael Levin, Southern Poverty Law Center

1943 births
American philosophers
American libertarians
American white nationalists
Jewish philosophers
City University of New York faculty
Columbia University alumni
Male critics of feminism
Living people
Race and intelligence controversy
Stuyvesant High School alumni
Place of birth missing (living people)